This is a list of the highest road passes in Switzerland. All the listed passes are crossed by paved roads. These are popular with drivers, bikers and cyclists for their spectacular scenery and are often the highlights of bicycle races such as Tour de Suisse and Tour de Romandie. Many of them are also served by public transport, the main transport company being PostBus Switzerland.

Only fully paved roads of which both ends are connected to the main Swiss or European road network are included. Dead-end roads such as the Sanetsch and Glas Pass are not listed. For a list including dead-end roads as well, see list of highest paved roads in Switzerland. For a list of all passes, whether crossed by a paved road or not, see List of mountain passes in Switzerland.

List

References
Swisstopo topographic maps (1:25,000)

External links
Alpen Pässe.ch

 
Road passes
Passes, mountain road
Highest road passes in Switzerland